Prestatyn and Rhyl Panthers are an amateur rugby league team based in Rhyl, North Wales. They play in the North Wales Conference.

History
Prestatyn and Rhyl Panthers won the North Wales 9s in 2012 and then joined the newly formed North Wales Conference finishing top of the table. However, they lost 48–26 against Conwy Celts in the grand final.

Honours
 North Wales 9s: 2012

See also

List of rugby league clubs in Britain

References

External links

2011 establishments in Wales
Rugby clubs established in 2011
Welsh rugby league teams
Sport in Denbighshire
Rhyl